The Korea Handball Federation (KHF) (Korean: 대한핸드볼협회) is the governing body of handball and beach handball in South Korea. KHF is affiliated to the Asian Handball Federation (AHF), Korean Sport & Olympic Committee and International Handball Federation (IHF) since 1960.

Competitions
 Handball Korea League

National teams
 South Korea men's national handball team
 South Korea men's national junior handball team
 South Korea men's national youth handball team
 South Korea women's national handball team
 South Korea women's national junior handball team
 South Korea women's national youth handball team

Competitions hosted

International
 2010 Women's Junior World Handball Championship
 1990 World Women's Handball Championship
 1988 Summer Olympics
 1985 Women's Junior World Handball Championship

Continental
 2021 Asian Women's Handball Championship
 2019 Asian Men's Club League Handball Championship
 2018 Asian Men's Handball Championship
 2017 Asian Women's Handball Championship
 2014 Asian Games
 2002 Asian Games
 1995 Asian Women's Junior Handball Championship
 1995 Asian Women's Handball Championship
 1986 Asian Games
 1983 Asian Men's Handball Championship

References

External links
 Official website 
 Republic of Korea at the IHF website.
 Republic of Korea at the AHF website.

Handball governing bodies
Handball in South Korea
Handball
Members
1960 establishments in South Korea